A truck is a wooden ball, disk, or bun-shaped cap at the top of a mast, with holes in it through which flag halyards are passed. Trucks are also used on wooden flagpoles, to prevent them from splitting.

Without a masthead truck, water could easily seep into the circular growth rings of a wooden mast. However, the grain in the truck is perpendicular to that of the mast, allowing the water to run off it.

References

Sailing rigs and rigging
Sailing ship components